The First American Art Magazine is a quarterly art magazine covering living, historical, and ancestral art of Indigenous peoples of the Americas.

Background
First American Art Magazine was established in 2013 "to provide a common platform for Native and non-Native academics, art professionals, artists, collectors, and other interested readers to seriously investigate and celebrate Indigenous American art—from ancestral to 21st century artwork." The publishing editor is America Meredith (Cherokee Nation); literary editor is Matthew Ryan Smith, PhD; publicity director is Barbara Harjo; and circulation manager is Melissa Dominguez.

Content
The magazine includes profiles of living Native artists, features articles, and several departments: Recent Developments (news); an "Exploring Native Graphic Design" column; Seven Directions (a top seven list); "Spotlight" (focusing on an individual artwork); Advice; Art + Literature; memorials; classified advertising; and reviews of art exhibitions, art books, and video/films.

Distribution
FAAM is distributed in Canada, the United States, and internationally by Disticor Magazine Distribution Services, as well as directly by the publisher and at Native American art fairs and conferences.

Honors
Library Journal selected First American Art Magazine as one of its Best Magazines launched in 2013, and wrote that, "A notable strength of the publication is its emphasis on the work of contemporary artists."

See also
 American Indian studies
 Roy Boney Jr. (Cherokee Nation)
 Kelly Church (Odawa/Ojibwe/Potawatomi)
 Teri Greeves (Kiowa)
 Suzan Shown Harjo, Hon.DFA (Cheyenne/Muscogee)
 Thollem McDonas
 Mary Jo Watson, PhD (Seminole)

References

External links
 
 "FIRST AMERICAN ART Celebrates Indigenous Art and Artists", by Dawn Karima, powwows.com
 "CN citizen launches ‘First American Art Magazine’", Cherokee Phoenix

Quarterly magazines published in the United States
Visual arts magazines published in the United States
Independent magazines
Indigenous art of the Americas
Magazines established in 2013
Magazines published in Oklahoma
Native American magazines
Native American studies
Magazines published in New Mexico